Bruce Davis may refer to:

Sports
Bruce Davis (offensive tackle) (1956–2021), American football offensive lineman
Bruce Davis (linebacker) (born 1985), American football linebacker and son of the above offensive lineman
Bruce Davis (wide receiver) (born 1963), American football wide receiver
Bruce Davis (Australian footballer) (born 1953), Australian rules footballer

Others
Bruce Davis (video game industry) (born 1952), American businessman formerly in the video game industry
Bruce R. Davis (born 1939), Australian electrical engineer
Bruce M. Davis (born 1942), member of the Manson family convicted of the murder of Donald "Shorty" Shea